Lachlan Milne, ACS, NZCS, is an Australian cinematographer. He is best known for his work on Hunt for the Wilderpeople, Minari, Love and Monsters and Stranger Things.

Filmography
Film

Television

Awards and nominations

References

External links 
 

Living people
Australian cinematographers
Year of birth missing (living people)